Margaret Mary Markov (born November 22, 1948) is an American retired actress. She had a supporting role in the romantic drama The Sterile Cuckoo (1969) with Liza Minnelli and co-starred in There Is No 13 (1974), as well as appearing in other films.

She was in the 1969 outlaw biker film Run, Angel, Run directed by Jack Starrett and the 1972 women in prison film The Hot Box co-written by Jonathan Demme.

She also appeared in the dark sex comedy/murder mystery Pretty Maids All in a Row (1971) with Rock Hudson, directed by Roger Vadim, whom she dated. Markov also starred opposite Pam Grier in two films: the 1972 Black Mama, White Mama and the 1974 The Arena (aka Naked Warriors). During the making of the latter, she started dating producer Mark Damon; the two later married and Markov retired.

Partial filmography
Run, Angel, Run (1969) as Meg Felton
The Sterile Cuckoo (1969) (uncredited)
Pretty Maids All in a Row (1971) as Polly
The Hot Box (1972) as Lynn Forrest
Black Mama, White Mama (1972) as Karen Brent
Hawkins: Death and the Maiden (TV movie, 1973) as Theresa Ruth Colman
The Arena (1974) as Bodicia
There Is No 13 (1974) as Number Eleven

References

External links 
 

1948 births
20th-century American actresses
American film actresses
American television actresses
American people of Serbian descent
Living people
21st-century American women